Panayotis Balaskas (born 19 October 1946) is a Greek chess player, two-times Greek Chess Championship winner (1976, 1979).

Biography
From the end of 1960s to the end of 1970s Panayotis Balaskas was one of Greek leading chess players. He twice won Greek Chess Championship: in 1976, and 1979. In 1975, in Caorle Panayotis Balaskas participated in World Chess Championship Mediterranean-African Zonal Tournament where ranked in 9th place.

Panayotis Balaskas played for Greece in the Chess Olympiad:
 In 1972, at second reserve board in the 20th Chess Olympiad in Skopje (+3, =1, -5).

Panayotis Balaskas played for Greece in the World Student Team Chess Championships:
 In 1968, at second reserve board in the 15th World Student Team Chess Championship in Ybbs (+0, =0, -3),
 In 1969, at first reserve board in the 16th World Student Team Chess Championship in Dresden (+4, =1, -5).

Panayotis Balaskas played for Greece in the Men's Chess Balkaniads:
 In 1972, at sixth board in the 4th Men's Chess Balkaniad in Sofia (+1, =0, -2),
 In 1975, at third board in the 7th Men's Chess Balkaniad in Istanbul (+1, =1, -2),
 In 1976, at fifth board in the 8th Men's Chess Balkaniad in Athens (+0, =0, -4),
 In 1977, at first board in the 9th Men's Chess Balkaniad in Albena (+0, =2, -2).

References

External links

1946 births
Living people
Greek chess players
Chess Olympiad competitors
20th-century Greek people